Events in the year 1974 in Portugal.

Incumbents
President: Américo Tomás (until 25 April), António de Spínola (from 25 April to 30 September), Francisco da Costa Gomes (from 30 September)
Prime Minister: Marcelo Caetano (until 25 April), Junta de Salvação Nacional (from 25 April to 16 May), Adelino da Palma Carlos (from 16 May to 18 July), Vasco Gonçalves (from 18 July)

Events
 25 April - Carnation Revolution

Arts and entertainment
Portugal participated in the Eurovision Song Contest 1974, with Paulo de Carvalho and the song "E depois do adeus".

Sport
In association football, for the first-tier league seasons, see 1973–74 Primeira Divisão and 1974–75 Primeira Divisão; for the Taça de Portugal seasons, see 1973–74 Taça de Portugal and 1974–75 Taça de Portugal. 
 9 June - Taça de Portugal Final

References

 
Years of the 20th century in Portugal